Zeugmatothrips is a genus of thrips in the family Phlaeothripidae.

Species
 Zeugmatothrips annulipes
 Zeugmatothrips badiicornis
 Zeugmatothrips badiipes
 Zeugmatothrips bennetti
 Zeugmatothrips bispinosus
 Zeugmatothrips borgmeieri
 Zeugmatothrips cinctus
 Zeugmatothrips femoralis
 Zeugmatothrips gerardoi
 Zeugmatothrips gracilis
 Zeugmatothrips hispidus
 Zeugmatothrips hoodi
 Zeugmatothrips mumbaca
 Zeugmatothrips niger
 Zeugmatothrips pallidulus
 Zeugmatothrips peltatus
 Zeugmatothrips priesneri
 Zeugmatothrips verae

References

Phlaeothripidae
Thrips
Thrips genera